Ana Ivanovic was the defending champion, but chose not to participate that year.

Dinara Safina won in the final 6–4, 6–2, against Flavia Pennetta.

Seeds
The top eight seeds received a bye into the second round.

Draw

Finals

Top half

Section 1

Section 2

Bottom half

Section 3

Section 4

External links
Draw and Qualifying Draw

East West Bank Classic
Singles
East West Bank Classic - Singles